Narayan Chandra Borkataky (born 1 April 1943) is a member of the 14th Lok Sabha of India. He represents the Mangaldoi constituency of Assam and is a member of the Bharatiya Janata Party (BJP) political party.

External links
 Home Page on the Parliament of India's Website

1943 births
Living people
India MPs 2004–2009
People from Sivasagar
Lok Sabha members from Assam
Bharatiya Janata Party politicians from Assam